The 2017 partypoker US Darts Masters was the inaugural staging of the tournament by the Professional Darts Corporation, as a third entry in the 2017 World Series of Darts. The tournament featured eight North American players who faced eight PDC players, which was held at the Tropicana Las Vegas in Las Vegas, United States from 14–15 July 2017.

Michael van Gerwen became the champion, defeating Daryl Gurney 8–6 in the final to win his first title in Vegas.

Prize money
This is how the prize money is divided:

Qualifiers
Adrian Lewis and Phil Taylor were both originally scheduled to take part but both withdrew. Lewis was replaced by Gerwyn Price, whilst Taylor was replaced by World Number six James Wade.

The eight invited PDC players, seeded according to the World Series Order of Merit, were:
  Michael van Gerwen (winner)
  Gary Anderson (semi-finals)
  Peter Wright (quarter-finals)
  James Wade (first round)
  Raymond van Barneveld (quarter-finals)
  Gerwyn Price (semi-finals)
  Daryl Gurney (runner-up)
  Max Hopp (first round)

The North American qualifier winners were:
  Chris White (first round)
  Willard Bruguier (first round)
  Dave Richardson (quarter-finals)
  David Cameron (first round)

The top 4 North American Order of Merit qualifiers were:
  Jayson Barlow (first round)
  DJ Sayre (first round)
  Shawn Brenneman (first round)
  Dawson Murschell (quarter-finals)

Draw

References

US Darts Masters
World Series of Darts
Sports competitions in the Las Vegas Valley
2017 in sports in Nevada
US Darts Masters 2017